Coporaque District is one of eight districts of the province Espinar in Peru.

Geography 
Some of the highest mountains of the district are listed below:

Ethnic groups 
The people in the district are mainly indigenous citizens of Quechua descent. Quechua is the language which the majority of the population (93.04%) learnt to speak in childhood, 6.73% of the residents started speaking using the Spanish language (2007 Peru Census).
Coporaque is looked upon as one of the poorest districts of the country.

See also 
 Mawk'allaqta

References